This is a list of  aircraft of Czechoslovakia during the interwar period. This list aims to show aircraft of the Czechoslovak Air Force during the interwar period hence it does not include prototypes of Czechoslovak aircraft.

Fighters 

 Aero A.18
 Avia BH-3
Letov Š-4
Letov Š-20
 Avia BH-21
 
 Avia BH-33
Letov Š-31
 Avia B-34
 Avia B-534

Bombers 

 Letov Š-6
 Aero A.11
 Aero A.12
Letov Š-16

 Aero A.30
 Aero A.32
 Aero A.100
 Bloch MB.200
 Aero A.304

Reconnaissance 

 Letov Š-1
 Avia BH-26
 Letov Š-28

Trainers 

 Aero Ae 01
 Letov Š-18

References

Lists of aircraft
Interwar period
Czech and Czechoslovakian military aircraft